Harry Taylor Willetts (1922 – 7 April 2005) was an English scholar of Russian, and English language translator of Russian literatures.

Early life 
In 1922, Willetts was born. Willetts'  father was Albert Willetts. Willetts' mother was Alice Taylor.

Education 
From 1940 to 1947, Willetts studied at The Queen's College, Oxford.

Career 
Willetts was professor of Russian history at Oxford University. Willetts was director of the Russian and East European Centre at St Antony's College, Oxford, where his colleagues included the noted Russian scholars Max Hayward, Harry Shukman and William Deakin. A prolific translator of Russian literature, Willetts is best known for his translations of the works of the Nobel Prize winner Alexander Solzhenitsyn. As a translator, he is often credited as H.T. Willetts.

After 1947, Willetts joined the Foreign Office in the Moscow embassy. Willetts joined St Antony's College in 1960.

Personal life 
In 1957 Willetts married Halina Szenbaum, a Polish Jew, in London, England.

Willetts' son was Sam Willetts, who first used drugs at age 11. He also had two other children: Cathy and Isobel.

Willetts was preceded in death by his wife Halina. Their son Sam Willetts became a poet and a drug addict.

References

External links 
 H. T. Willetts at librarything.com
 Russian and Eurasian Studies Centre Library at St. Antony's College

English translators
Russian–English translators
Slavists
Fellows of St Antony's College, Oxford
1922 births
2005 deaths
20th-century British translators
20th-century English historians
Alumni of The Queen's College, Oxford